Heraklion is one of the four regional units of Crete. The capital is the city of Heraklion.

Geography

The regional unit of Heraklion borders on the regional units of Rethymno to the west and Lasithi to the east.  Farmlands are situated in the central and the northern parts, at the coast and in valleys. The mountains dominate the rest of the regional unit, notably the south.  The main mountains are parts of Ida or Idi Mountains to the west and Asterousia in the south.  The regional unit includes the island of Dia to the north.

Except for the mountains which receive mild to cool winters unlike northern Greece, the warm to hot Mediterranean climate dominates the regional unit.

Ancient history
Within the Heraklion regional unit's boundaries are a number of significant Neolithic and Minoan settlements, most notably the ancient palace complexes of Knossos and Phaistos. While both archaeological sites evince Neolithic habitation from 7000 BC, it is the rich finds of Minoan civilisation, which flourished approximately 2800 to 1450 BC, that command the greatest scholarly attention.

Important ancient cities are:
Knossos
Phaistos
Gortys
Tylissos
Malia
Lyttos
Amnisos
Kaloi Limenes
Heraklion

Population history

1991 - 263,868
2001 - 292,482
2011 - 305,490

Administration

The regional unit Heraklion is subdivided into 8 municipalities. These are (number as in the map in the infobox):

Archanes-Asterousia (2)
Faistos (7)
Gortyna (4)
Heraklion (Irakleio, 1)
Hersonissos (Chersonisos, 8)
Malevizi (5)
Minoa Pediada (6)
Viannos (3)

Prefecture

The Heraklion prefecture was created in 1915, after Crete joined with the rest of Greece. As a part of the 2011 Kallikratis government reform, the regional unit Heraklion was created out of the former prefecture Heraklion. The prefecture had the same territory as the present regional unit. At the same time, the municipalities were reorganised, according to the table below.

Provinces

Province of Pyrgiotissa - Voroi
Province of Kainourgio - Moires
Province of Malevizi - Agios Myronas
Province of Temenos - Heraklion
Province of Pediada - Kasteli
Province of Monofatsi - Pyrgos
Province of Viannos - Pefkos
Note: Provinces no longer hold any legal status in Greece.

Transport

GR-90/E65
GR-97
GR-99

Notable people
 El Greco (medieval Castilian nickname meaning "the Greek"), by which Δομήνικος Θεοτοκόπουλος Domênikos Theotokópoulos, is best known. (Born 1541, Fodele, Heraklion and died on April 7, 1614, Toledo, Spain), a world-famous painter, sculptor and architect
Nikos Kazantzakis was born in the village Varvaro (renamed to Myrtia in 1965) The municipal unit in which Myrtia is located, was named after him.

Communications
The following television channels serve the prefecture:
Creta Channel
Kriti TV

See also
 List of settlements in the Heraklion regional unit

Line notes

References
 Arthur J. Evans, (1921–35) The Palace of Minos, volumes 1-4
 C. Michael Hogan, Knossos fieldnotes, Modern Antiquarian (2007)
 Ian Swindale, Phaistos, Minoan Crete Retrieved 13 May 2013.

External links
Monuments in the prefecture of Heraklion

 
Prefectures of Greece
Regional units of Crete